Violet Jennie Dreschfeld (1890–1975) was a British artist known for her portrait sculptures.

Biography
Dreschfeld was born and grew up in the Chorlton suburb of Manchester, one of three children to Selina and Julius Dreschfeld, a German-born physician, who became a Professor of Pathology. Violet Dreschfeld studied sculpture in London, where she was based in the 1910s. She was active throughout that decade producing portrait busts, particularly of female subjects. From 1929 she began exhibiting at the Société Nationale des Beaux-Arts in Paris.

References

1890 births
1975 deaths
20th-century English sculptors
20th-century English women artists
Artists from Manchester
English women sculptors